The Women's singles luge competition at the 1988 Winter Olympics in Calgary was held on 16 and 18 February, at Canada Olympic Park.

Results

References

Luge at the 1988 Winter Olympics
1988 in women's sport
Luge